The Patrick D. Hanan Book Prize for Translation (China and Inner Asia) is given biennially to an outstanding English translation of a significant work in any genre originally written in Chinese or an Inner Asian Language, from any time period.

About the Prize 
The prize was established in 2015, and is named for Patrick D. Hanan, who was renowned for his translations from Chinese into English. it is administered by the Association for Asian Studies.

Winners

2020 
 Winner: Eleanor Goodman, The Roots of Wisdom by Zang Di, Zephyr Press.
 Honorable Mention: Michael Berry, Remains of Life by Wu He, Columbia UP.

2018 
 Winner: Stephen Durrant, Wai-yee Li, David Schaberg, Zuo Tradition/Zuo Zhuan: Commentary on the “Spring and Autumn Annals”, University of Washington Press.
 Honorable Mention: Anthony Barbieri-Low, Robin Yates, Law, State and Society in Early Imperial China, Brill

2016 
 Winner: Xiaofei Tian, The World of a Tiny Insect: A Memoir of the Taiping Rebellion and Its Aftermath by Zhang Daye, University of Washington Press
 Honorable Mention: Anne Behnke Kinney, Exemplary Women of Early China: The Lienü zhuan of Liu Xiang, Columbia University Press

References 

 Translation awards